Cedric Bernard Landrum (born September 3, 1963) is an American former Major League Baseball outfielder. He played in parts of two seasons in the majors, 1991 for the Chicago Cubs and 1993 for the New York Mets. He was also the hitting coach for the Joliet JackHammers.

Of his 78 games in the majors, Landrum appeared 25 times as a pinch runner and 21 times as a pinch hitter. In 1991, he stole 27 bases in 56 games, getting caught just 5 times.

External links

Major League Baseball outfielders
Chicago Cubs players
New York Mets players
Geneva Cubs players
Winston-Salem Spirits players
Pittsfield Cubs players
Charlotte Knights players
Iowa Cubs players
Denver Zephyrs players
Norfolk Tides players
Portland Beavers players
Colorado Springs Sky Sox players
Baseball players from Alabama
People from Butler, Alabama
North Alabama Lions baseball players
1963 births
Living people